Symphony No. 4 is an orchestral composition in two movements by the American composer Christopher Rouse.  The work was commissioned by the New York Philharmonic, for which Rouse was then composer-in-residence.  The piece was completed June 30, 2013 and was premiered on June 5, 2014, in Avery Fisher Hall, New York City, by the New York Philharmonic under the direction of Alan Gilbert.

Composition

Inspiration
Regarding the inspiration of the work and whether the symphony had a programmatic intent, Rouse has remained deliberately ambiguous.  In the program notes to the score, he commented:

Structure
The symphony has a duration of roughly twenty minutes and is composed in two movements:
Felice
Doloroso

Instrumentation
The symphony is scored for piccolo, two flutes, two oboes, English horn, two clarinets, contrabass clarinet, two bassoons, contrabassoon, four French horns, three trumpets, four trombones, tuba, timpani, percussion (three players), harp, celesta, and strings (violins I & II, violas, violoncellos, and double basses).

Reception
Alex Ross of The New Yorker praised the symphony, calling it "a short and engagingly strange piece that plunged without warning from dance to dolor."  WQXR-FM called it "a grand gesture in symphonic writing."  Anthony Tommasini of The New York Times described the piece as "an intriguing 20-minute work structured in two connected movements of vastly contrasting character: the first bustling and seemingly cheerful, the second grim and despairing."  Tommasini further commented:

References

4
2013 compositions
Rouse 4
Music commissioned by the New York Philharmonic